Bulacan's 6th congressional district is one of the seven congressional districts of the Philippines in the province of Bulacan. It has been represented in the House of Representatives since 2022. The district consists of municipalities in southcentral and eastern Bulacan, namely Angat, Norzagaray, and Santa Maria. It is currently represented in the 19th Congress by Salvador A. Pleyto of the Lakas-CMD.

Representation history

Election results

2022

See also
 Legislative districts of Bulacan

References

Congressional districts of the Philippines
Politics of Bulacan
Congressional districts of Central Luzon
2022 establishments in the Philippines
Constituencies established in 2022